Montie Ralph Rissell (born November 28, 1958), also known as Monte, is an American serial killer and rapist who raped and murdered five women between 1976 and 1977 in Alexandria, Virginia, where he lived.

Early life
Rissell lived the first seven years of his life in his hometown of Wellington, Kansas. Rissell lived with his mother, who was married and divorced twice by the time Rissell was 12. Rissell's biological father left the home when Rissell was seven years old. Rissell had two older siblings: a brother, Harold, and a sister. 

By the age of 14, Rissell had committed his first rape. He was charged with a series of petty crimes and was institutionalized in 1973. Shortly after his release in 1975, he was arrested for attempted robbery after he attempted to rob a woman with a knife in an elevator near his home. He received a five-year suspended sentence and dropped out of T. C. Williams High School at the age of 17.

Murders
Rissell was reportedly angry with his ex-girlfriend after he saw her with another man. On August 4, 1976, Rissell saw 26-year-old Aura Marina Gabor, a sex worker living in the same apartment complex as Rissell on the 400 block of North Armistead Street in Alexandria. Rissell claimed he grew angry with her after she "allowed" him to have sex with her and she made it seem like she enjoyed it, so he drowned her in a nearby ravine.

The second murder occurred in March 1977, when Rissell raped and stabbed 22-year-old McDonald's manager trainee, Ursula Miltenberger, near the Hamlet Apartments. Her body was found March 6 in a Fairfax woods.

The third murder victim was 27-year-old Gladys Ross Bradley, a post office clerk and resident of Hamlet Apartments. Sometime in April 1977, Rissell waited outside her house with a steak knife from his mother's kitchen. He raped her twice, then dragged her by her feet to a nearby creek, where he then drowned her. Her body was found April 29, 1977.

The fourth murder victim was 34-year-old Aletha Byrd, a personnel counselor at the Woodward & Lothrop department store at Tysons Corner Center. Aletha had been missing from her home since April 10, 1977. She was found dead with multiple stab wounds on May 17 in a wooded area.

The fifth and final victim was 24-year-old Jeanette McClelland, a graphics design proofreader at Bru-El Graphics and also a resident of Hamlet Apartments. She was found raped and stabbed 100 times in a culvert near Shirley Highway on May 5, 1977.  On May 18, police (who had Rissell under surveillance due to his being a suspect) searched Rissell's car and found Byrd's wallet, keys, and comb. Police later confirmed that Rissell's fingerprints were found on Miltenberger's car. Rissell confessed to killing all five women.

Rissell was charged with abducting, raping and murdering the five women. However, because he pleaded guilty to the murder charges, the abduction and rape charges were dropped. Rissell was sentenced to five consecutive life sentences on October 11, 1977. He was 18 years old at the time of his sentencing.

Prison
While in prison, Rissell wrote a 461-page handwritten manuscript detailing his murders.

Rissell became eligible for parole in 1995, which was heavily protested by the victims' family members and the community. Since then, Rissell has been granted an annual parole hearing each November; he has been denied parole each time.

Rissell was previously incarcerated at Augusta Correctional Center, and is currently incarcerated at Pocahontas State Correctional Center in Virginia.

Popular culture
Rissell was featured in season 1, episode 4 of the 2017 Netflix crime drama, Mindhunter; actor Sam Strike portrayed him.

See also 
 List of serial killers in the United States

References

1959 births
1976 murders in the United States
1977 murders in the United States
20th-century American criminals
American male criminals
American people convicted of murder
American prisoners sentenced to life imprisonment
American rapists
American serial killers
Crimes in Virginia
Criminals from Virginia
Living people
Male serial killers
People convicted of murder by Virginia
T. C. Williams High School alumni
Violence against women in the United States